Arthur Francis Rollini (February 13, 1912 – December 30, 1993) was an American jazz musician who played the tenor saxophone, flute and clarinet. His nickname was "Schneeze".

Early life 
Born in New York City, Rollini came from an Italian descent musical family and grew up in Larchmont, New York. Multi-instrumentalist Adrian Rollini was his older brother.

Career 
In 1929, Rollini played in England for Fred Elizalde and worked for the California Ramblers and big band pioneer Paul Whiteman.

From 1934 to 1939, he was a member of the Benny Goodman Orchestra. The highlight of that period was a breakout performance for big band jazz at Carnegie Hall in 1938. He worked with Richard Himber and from 1941–1942 with Will Bradley. From 1943 to 1958, he worked as a studio musician for the American Broadcasting Company.

Rollini's work can be found on recordings with the bands of Wingy Manone, Adrian Rollini (1933–34), Benny Goodman, Joe Venuti (1935), Lionel Hampton (1937), Harry James (1938), Louis Armstrong (1945) and Brad Gowans (1946). In 1939, he starred in an Allstar band of Goodman, Bunny Berigan and Jack Teagarden with ("Blue Lu").

In 1987, Rollini published his autobiography Thirty Years with the Big Bands.

Personal life 
Rollini met Ena Kelsall, daughter of actor and entertainer Greg Kelsey, in 1932. They married on November 25, 1935. They had a daughter Adrienne in 1938 and a son Arthur Jr. in 1941.

References

Sources 
 

1912 births
1993 deaths
American jazz clarinetists
American jazz tenor saxophonists
American male saxophonists
20th-century American saxophonists
20th-century American male musicians
American male jazz musicians